V. I. S. Jayapalan is a Sri Lankan-Tamil writer, political commentator and actor who has appeared in Tamil language films. He made his acting debut in Vetrimaaran's Aadukalam (2011) and won a National Film Award for his portrayal.

Career
Jayapalan was born in Uduvil, Jaffna, Sri Lanka. He began writing in the 1970s while studying at the University of Jaffna and published his first anthology in 1986. He studied a degree in Economics during his time at the university, while also leading the student union. Since then he has published at least 12 anthologies of poetry and short fiction. As the Sri Lankan Civil War escalated, he fled to Oslo, Norway in 1988 and since then he has been living in Norway as a Norwegian citizen and was moving back and forth to South Indian state of Tamil Nadu to continue his art and literary work. In 1995, he was awarded as the best immigrant writer by the Norwegian Writers’ Association, with poetry being translated into English, Norwegian as well as in to Sinhala. In 2009, some of his poems were translated into English and published as a book in Canada - named 'Wilting Laughter’ - along with selected poems of R. Cheran and Puthuvai Raththinathurai.

Through his friendship with film maker Balu Mahendra, he was introduced to Vetrimaaran who was keen to cast Jayapalan in his film Aadukalam (2011). After accepting the offer, he worked alongside an ensemble cast including actor Dhanush, with the film releasing to a positive response at the box office in January 2011. Critics lauded his performance as the cock fighting clan's patriarch, Pettaikaran, with Sify.com labelling him as a "revelation" and Behindwoods writing that with the "right kind of expressions and body language, he demonstrates a new type of villainy". He subsequently went on to win a special jury award at the National Film Awards in 2011, as well as garnering nominations at the Filmfare and Vijay Awards.

Filmography

See also
Cinema of India

References

1944 births
Male actors in Tamil cinema
Alumni of the University of Jaffna
Sri Lankan emigrants to Norway
Naturalised citizens of Norway
Refugees in Norway
Tamil male actors
Living people
People from Northern Province, Sri Lanka
Sri Lankan Tamil actors
Sri Lankan Tamil poets
Sri Lankan Tamil writers